Viktor Nikolayevich Belyaev (28 March 1896 — 25 July 1953) was a Soviet aircraft designer, former head of the OKB-4, and the founder of the science of the strength of aircraft structures in the Soviet Union.

Biography 
Viktor Belyaev was born in the family of Nikolai Vasilievich Belyaev, an engineer and founder of the Upper Volga railway. Before the revolution, he studied mathematics at the Moscow State University. After the revolution, he managed to continue his studies for short periods of time at the Moscow Polytechnic Institute (1920-1922) and at the 1st Moscow State University (1922-1923).

He began his career in 1918. For some time he worked at a number of enterprises, including the railway and teaching, but in 1925 he began to work in the aviation industry as a strength engineer in the design bureau of Dmitry Grigorovich.

In 1926 he transferred to TsAGI, to the design office of Andrei Tupolev in the brigade of Vladimir Petlyakov, where he participated in the strength calculations of the ANT-6, ANT-7, ANT-9, ANT-14, ANT-20 aircraft. Soon the Petlyakov team was transformed into a separate design bureau from 1931 where Belyaev took the post of chief of the settlement brigade. In 1930, Viktor Belyaev began to work part-time as a researcher in the strength department of TsAGI.

In the early 1930s, Belyaev created the BP-2 (TsAGI-2) glider, a prototype of an unusual aircraft he had conceived. In August 1934, on a glider rally in Koktebel, the flights of this glider showed excellent flight qualities.

In 1935, Viktor Nikolaevich consolidated his success by creating a record-breaking glider BP-3, which made its first flight on June 18, 1935. The aerodynamic quality of the glider was very high at 33 units. There is unconfirmed information about the construction of several BP-3 in the workshops of the school of sea pilots in the city of Yeysk.

In 1935, a competition for high-speed transport aircraft was announced by the Aviation All-Union Scientific Engineering and Technical Society (AviaVNITO) and the newspaper “At the Wheel”. Viktor Belyaev's design team introduced a model of a twin-engine and two-body aircraft with an interesting pattern, called AviaVNITO-3. The project sparked great interest, and was among the winners of the competition and was recommended for construction, but in the end, none of the competing aircraft were built. In 1937, the design team began developing a bomber on the basis of the AviaVNITO-3 project. In 1939, Viktor Belyaev was appointed one of the chief designers of the TsAGI plant. In July 1940, he was awarded the degree of chief designer of the third category, together with the aircraft designers Artem Mikoyan, Mikhail Gurevich, Nikolai Kamov et al.

After returning from evacuation in 1943 and until his death, Viktor Belyaev worked at TsAGI. In 1940, he was awarded the degree of Doctor of Technical Sciences without defending a thesis, and in 1946 the title of professor.

Awards 
 Order of the Red Banner of Labour (1931, 1945)

Aircraft 

 BP-2 (TsAGI-2) 
 BP-3
Record glider of a tailless scheme with a backward swept wing with a central part in the form of a “seagull”. The first flight was made on July 18, 1935. According to unconfirmed data, several BP-3s were built in the workshops of the school of sea pilots in the town of Yeisk.
BP-3 characteristics:
•	Crew — 2 people.
•	Wingspan — 20 m.
•	Empty weight — 400 kg.
•	Aerodynamic quality — 33:1.

 UK-1А 
Experimental aircraft with "flex wing". 
 EON
Experimental single fighter.
 DB-LK   
Long-range bomber - flying wing.
The Beljajew DB-LK was built and flew satisfactorily in 1939 and in 1940 it was presented to the public during the Moscow parade over the Red Square. Only one was built, and it was destroyed by the Soviet authorities due to the WWII.

Family 
His father, Nikolai Vasilievich Belyaev was the founder and chairman of the Society of the Upper Volga Railway. His mother, Alexandra Alexandrovna,, came from the Alekseev, which was a family of merchants. She ended up emigrating to Nice. His older brothers and sister also emigrated after the revolution: Alexander (1891-1977) to Berlin, Nikolay (1892-1969) to Paris, and Ksenia (1894-1985) to Nice. Other family members (brothers Alexey (1897 -?), Lev (1899 -?), David (1901-?) remained in the USSR.

See also 
Glider
Soviet Air Forces

Bibliography 
 Aviation and time, No. 4, 2008. Article of M. Maslov, Professor Belyaev's Mechanical Birds. http://www.k2x2.info/transport_i_aviacija/aviacija_i_vremja_2008_04/p9.php (ru) 
 Encyclopedia "Aviation". - M .:The Great Russian Encyclopedia. Svishchev G. G. 1998. (ru)
 Yelenevsky G.S. V.N. Belyaev (1896–1953) // Strength of aircraft. M., 1967. P. 3–11. (ru)
 Kutyinov V.F., Lyakhovenko I.A. To the 100th anniversary of the birth of V.N. Belyaev // Air fleet equipment. 1996. No. 5-6. Pp. 59–62. (ru)
 Frolov V.M. 90 years since the birth of V.N. Belyaev // From the history of aviation and astronautics. M., 1986. Ed. 64. pp. 20–28. (ru)
 Beljajew BP-3 scale 1:2 Belyaev Viktor Nikolayevich https://www.youtube.com/watch?v=DX8aDmfMT3k
 Beljajew BP-3 Bau https://vimeo.com/167866848 
 Beljajew BP2 Erstflug https://www.youtube.com/watch?v=-rRUuYoNBFc 
 Scratchbuilt 1/72 Belyaiev BP-2 1934 http://www.internetmodeler.com/scalemodels/aviation/Scratchbuilt_1_72_Belyaiev_BP-2_1934.php 
 BP-2 (TsAGI-2) http://www.airwar.ru/enc/glider/bp2.html (ru)
 Yudenok V. Soviet aircraft of the Second World War. 
 Le Fana de l'Aviation. Pierre Gaillard, Victor Kulikov. L'etrange, mais Veritable DB-LK.
 Le Fana de l'Aviation. Mikhail Maslov. Le professeur Belyaev et ses etranges ailes.
 Beljajew BP-3 Flug mit on.board: https://www.youtube.com/watch?v=DX8aDmfMT3k

References 

1896 births
1953 deaths
20th-century Russian engineers
Recipients of the Order of the Red Banner of Labour
Russian aerospace engineers
Russian designers
Soviet aerospace engineers
Soviet designers